There are several Victoria Barracks in the world.

Victoria Barracks, Ballater
Victoria Barracks, Belfast
Victoria Barracks, Beverley
Victoria Barracks, Bodmin
Victoria Barracks, Brisbane
Victoria Barracks, Hong Kong
Victoria Barracks, Melbourne
Victoria Barracks, Portsmouth
Victoria Barracks, Sydney
Victoria Barracks, Windsor